Jonathon Morris (born 20 July 1960) is an English actor and former television presenter.

Career
Morris is best known for his role as Adrian Boswell in Carla Lane's comedy Bread, in which he starred for the series' entire five-year run between 1986 and 1991, and which made him a well-known face on British television.

Prior to Bread, he had appeared as a regular in the early 1980s ITV comedy That Beryl Marston!, and in leading roles in two of the BBC's Sunday Classic Serial adaptations, Beau Geste in 1982 and The Prisoner of Zenda in 1984. He had also played guest roles in The Professionals, Doctor Who serial Snakedance and Granada's short-lived soap The Practice.

His rise to fame in Bread led to Morris forging a career as a presenter. He presented CBBC game show The Movie Game from 1991 to 1993, replacing Phillip Schofield. He made a number of appearances on the popular '90s Channel 5 game show Night Fever.  In 2005, Morris competed in the third series of Channel 4 sports-based reality show The Games. He withdrew from the series halfway through and was replaced by former Hear’Say singer Danny Foster. In 2008 he appeared in an edition of programme Drop the Celebrity; however, his attempt to win ended in failure.

His acting career after Bread continued, although he faded from the limelight during the 1990s. He appeared in Carlton's revival of the Comedy Playhouse series in 1993, and in 1995 he played El Gallo in the film version of the musical The Fantasticks (released in 2000) where he played the con-man who enchanted his con's heart. He has also played Ash, a vampire, in two films of the Full Moon Entertainment production studios. The Fantasticks (2000), Vampire Journals (1997) and Subspecies 4: Bloodstorm introduced Morris to US audiences.

Filmography

Film

Television

References

External links
 Jonathon Morris Official Website
 Official writing website.
 https://web.archive.org/web/20110527042227/http://www.thisislincolnshire.co.uk/news/article-1949255-detail/article.html
 
BBC TV Database

1960 births
Living people
English male television actors
English television presenters
Morris, Jonathan